Footer Davis Probably Is Crazy is a book written by Susan Vaught and published by Simon & Schuster on 3 March 2015 which later went on to win the Edgar Award for Best Juvenile in 2016.

Plot summary
This contemporary novel is set in Bugtussle, Mississippi, in the Southern United States. The narrator, 11-year-old Footer Davis, has to deal with her mother's bipolar disorder while trying to find out what happened to the Abrams children after their barn burned down. It troubles her that she seems to be having hallucinations – but they may be repressed memories. Footer is on the mission to do almost everything to help his friends, family, and herself.

References 

2015 American novels
2015 children's books
American children's novels
Children's mystery novels
Edgar Award-winning works
Novels set in Mississippi
Simon & Schuster books